Jesús Miguel Soraire (born 3 December 1988) is an Argentine professional footballer who plays as a midfielder for Central Córdoba.

Career
Soraire began his career with Almirante Brown, prior to featuring for Villa Cubas in Torneo Argentino B during the 2012–13 campaign. He departed at the conclusion of that season, subsequently being signed by Torneo Argentino A's San Jorge. He made his debut on 17 August against Central Norte, which was one of twenty-three appearances in 2013–14. After joining Chaco For Ever for the 2014 Torneo Federal A campaign, Soraire agreed to join fellow third tier team San Martín in January 2015. His first goal arrived on 5 July during a draw with Juventud Antoniana. Soraire had a six-month stint back with Almirante Brown in 2016.

Six months later in 2016, San Jorge resigned Soraire. Forty-two games and two goals followed. On 19 July 2018, Soraire joined Primera B Nacional side Arsenal de Sarandí. He made his professional football bow versus Gimnasia y Esgrima on 25 August.

Career statistics
.

References

External links

1988 births
Living people
Sportspeople from Tucumán Province
Argentine footballers
Association football midfielders
Torneo Argentino B players
Torneo Argentino A players
Torneo Federal A players
Primera Nacional players
San Jorge de Tucumán footballers
Chaco For Ever footballers
San Martín de Tucumán footballers
Arsenal de Sarandí footballers
Central Córdoba de Santiago del Estero footballers